Laponia may refer to:

 Laponia (historical province), a historical Finnish and Swedish province
 Laponia (historical province of Finland)
 Laponian area, a wildlife area in Sweden
 The Latin name for Lapland

See also 
 Lapponia (disambiguation)